The TV Album is a compilation CD of songs by "Weird Al" Yankovic that features songs about television and TV shows. In 1993, Yankovic's former record label, Scotti Brothers, had released a similar album called The Food Album that contained songs about food. The artwork was done by Mad magazine veteran Jack Davis.

Release
The album was released by Scotti Brothers Records and was only begrudgingly approved by Yankovic. At the time, Scotti Brothers had insisted on putting out a new album by Yankovic in order to meet monetary projections for the fiscal quarter, despite the fact that no new album was ready; Bad Hair Day would not be released until a year later. Scotti Brothers had previously released a similar compilation album in 1993 entitled The Food Album. However, when it came time to release The TV Album, Yankovic reported that "the record company was a whole lot nicer when they asked the second time", and that there was "more groveling [and] less demanding". Following the release of The Food Album and The TV Album—in addition to the various greatest hits records that had been released—Scotti Brothers used-up all of their compilation options in Yankovic's contract, which prevented the release of further compilations when Volcano Records acquired his contract in the late 1990s.

In Canada, it was released as The MuchMusic TV Album.

Track listing

References

"Weird Al" Yankovic compilation albums
1995 compilation albums
Scotti Brothers Records compilation albums
Rock 'n Roll Records compilation albums
Rock 'n Roll Records albums
Scotti Brothers Records albums